Sebastián Prieto and Horacio Zeballos were the defending champions but chose not to compete.
Juan Sebastián Cabal and Robert Farah won the final against Víctor Estrella and Alejandro González 7–6(6), 6–4.

Seeds

Draw

Draw

References
 Doubles Draw

Seguros Bolivar Open Bogota - Doubles
2010 MD